I Don't Know How to Dance is the debut studio album by Swedish singer Oscar Zia, released in Sweden on 26 March 2014 by Warner Music. It was preceded by the single "Yes We Can" which made it to the final of Melodifestivalen 2014. The album debuted at number three in Sweden in April.

Background
Zia first come into media attention by auditioning for the inaugural X Factor (Swedish TV series) in 2012. Zia went on to finish 8th. In 2013, Zia was the runner up in Let's Dance 2013. His first single “#Fail” was released in June 2013. In 2014, Zia entered the Melodifestivalen 2014 with the song “Yes We Can” which came 8th in March 2014. Later that month, Zia released his debut studio album.

Review
Sami Luukela of WiwiBloggs said “Overall, I Don’t Know How To Dance is a nice pop album, even if it doesn’t really bring anything new to the scene.” Also saying “The best track is a song called “Ballare Con Me”… it is a real summer anthem with a lot of bass.”

Track listing
 “Yes We Can” – 3:03	
 “Love On The Run” – 3:33	
 “Embers” – 3:34	
 “Ballare Con Me” – 3:12	
 “Without You” - 3:23	
 “Kiss (I Don't Know How To Dance)” – 3:10	
 “#Fail” – 3:23	
 “Breathe” – 3:39

Charts

Release history

References

2014 debut albums
Oscar Zia albums